Crapartinella is an extinct genus of therocephalians. It is represented by a single species, Crapartinella croucheri, that was named from the Karoo Basin of South Africa in 1975. Crapartinella is the only eutheriodont known to have vomerine teeth, a primitive condition among tetrapods.

References

Therocephalia genera
Prehistoric synapsids of Africa
Fossil taxa described in 1975